Budesonide, sold under the brand name Pulmicort among others, is a medication of the corticosteroid type. It is available as an inhaler, nebulization solution, pill, nasal spray, and rectal forms. The inhaled form is used in the long-term management of asthma and chronic obstructive pulmonary disease (COPD). The nasal spray is used for allergic rhinitis and nasal polyps. The pills in a delayed release form and rectal forms may be used for inflammatory bowel disease including Crohn's disease, ulcerative colitis, and microscopic colitis.

Common side effects with the inhaled form include respiratory infections, cough, and headaches. Common side effects with the pills include feeling tired, vomiting, and joint pains. Serious side effects include an increased risk of infection, loss of bone strength, and cataracts. Long-term use of the pill form may cause adrenal insufficiency. Stopping the pills suddenly following long-term use may therefore be dangerous. The inhaled form is generally safe in pregnancy. Budesonide chiefly acts as a glucocorticoid.

Budesonide was initially patented in 1973. Commercial use as an asthma medication began in 1981. It is on the World Health Organization's List of Essential Medicines. Some forms are available as a generic medication. In 2019, generic budesonide was listed as involved in Teva's price fixing scheme in the United States. In 2020, it was the 207th most commonly prescribed medication in the United States, with more than 2million prescriptions.

Medical uses

Asthma
Budesonide is given by metered-dose inhaler or nebulizer for maintenance and prophylactic treatment of asthma, including patients who require oral corticosteroids and those who may benefit from a systemic dose reduction.

Inflammatory bowel disease
Formulations of delayed-release budesonide are an effective treatment for mild-to-moderately active Crohn's disease involving the ileum and/or ascending colon.  A Cochrane review found evidence for up to three months (but not longer) of maintenance of remission in Crohn's disease.

Budesonide assists in the induction of remission in people with active ulcerative colitis.

Budesonide is highly effective and recommended as the drug of choice in microscopic colitis, for induction and maintenance of remission, and for both the lymphocytic colitis and collagenous colitis forms.

Allergic rhinitis
Budesonide in the form of nasal sprays is a treatment for allergic rhinitis.

Eosinophilic esophagitis
Topical budesonide has considerable effects in eosinophilic esophagitis. For this use, it is formulated as a tablet that disperses in the mouth, and sold under the brand name Jorveza.

Berger's disease 
Budesonide (Tarpeyo) is indicated to reduce proteinuria (increased protein levels in the urine) in adults with primary immunoglobulin A (IgA) nephropathy (Berger's disease) at risk of rapid disease progression.

Side effects
Nasal budesonide inhalers have been associated with a number of side effects.  These include nose irritation or burning, bleeding or sores in the nose, lightheadedness, upset stomach, cough, hoarseness, dry mouth, rash, sore throat, bad taste in mouth, change in mucus, and blurred vision.  Other symptoms which should be reported immediately include difficulty in breathing, swelling of the face, white patches in the throat, mouth, or nose, irregular menstrual periods, severe acne, and on rare occasions, behavioral changes (mostly affecting children)

Contraindications
Budesonide is contraindicated as a primary treatment of status asthmaticus or other acute episode of asthma where intensive measures are required.  It is also contraindicated for patients who have hypersensitivity to budesonide.

Interactions
Those taking tablets or capsules orally should avoid grapefruit and grapefruit juice and echinacea.

 Grapefruit juice may double bioavailability of oral budesonide.
 Echinacea diminishes bioavailability.

Also, high-fat meals delay absorption but do not impede absorption.

Pharmacology
Budesonide is an agonist of glucocorticoid receptors. Among its effects are:

 Controls the rate of protein synthesis.
 Depresses the migration of polymorphonuclear leukocytes and fibroblasts.
 Reverses capillary permeability and lysosomal stabilization at the cellular level to prevent or control inflammation.
 Has a potent glucocorticoid activity and weak mineralocorticoid activity.

Pharmacokinetics
 Onset of action: Nebulization: 2–8 days; Inhalation: 24 hours; Nasal: 10 hours
 Peak effect: Nebulization: 4–6 weeks; Inhalation: 1–2 weeks
 Distribution: 2.2-3.9 L/kg
 Protein binding: 85% to 90%
 Metabolism: Hepatic via CYP3A4 to two metabolites: 16 alpha-hydroxyprednisolone and 6 beta-hydroxybudesonide; minor activity
Budesonide is extensively metabolized in first pass, resulting in a low bioavailability and systemic effects
 Bioavailability: Capsule: 9% to 21%; Nebulization: 6%; Inhalation: 6% to 13%
 Half-life elimination: 2–3.6 hours
 Time to peak: Capsule: 0.5–10 hours (variable in Crohn's disease); Nebulization: 10–30 minutes; Inhalation: 1–2 hours; Tablet: 7.4-19.2 hours
 Excretion: urine (60%) and feces as metabolites.

Chemistry

Budesonide, also known as 11β,21-dihydroxy-16α,17α-(butylidenebis(oxy))pregna-1,4-diene-3,20-dione, is a synthetic pregnane steroid and non-halogenated cyclic ketal corticosteroid. It is the C16α hydroxyl, C16α,17α cyclic ketal with butyraldehyde derivative of prednisolone (11β,17α,21-trihydroxypregna-1,4-diene-3,20-dione).

Stereoisomerism

Society and culture

Legal status 
On 19 May 2022, the Committee for Medicinal Products for Human Use (CHMP) of the European Medicines Agency (EMA) adopted a positive opinion, recommending the granting of a conditional marketing authorization for the medicinal product Kinpeygo, intended for the treatment of primary immunoglobulin A nephropathy. The applicant for this medicinal product is Calliditas Therapeutics AB. Kinpeygo is a hybrid medicine of Entocort which has been authorised in the EU since 2 April 1992. Kinpeygo contains the same active substance as Entocort but has a different formulation and a different indication. Kinpeygo was approved for medical use in the European Union in July 2022.

Brand names

Aeronide (TH); Aquacort (DE); B Cort (CO); Bronex (PH); Budair (MY); Budecort DP (MY); Budenofalk (DE, GB, HK, KP, PH, SG); Budeson (AR); Budeson Aqua (AR); BudeSpray (TH); Budiair (KP); Budicort Respules (IL); Budinide (KSA); Bunase (TH); Clebudan (CN); Cortiment (CA, GB, AU); Cycortide (HK); Denecort (PH); Duasma (TW); Eltair (MY); Entocort (AR, AT, BE, BR, CH, CZ, DK, FI, FR, GB, HK, IE, IL, IT, KP, NL, NO, PL, PT, SE, TR); Giona Easyhaler (MY, SG, TH); Inflammide (PE); Miflonid (CZ); Miflonide (BE, DE, IL, IT, NZ, PT); Neumocort (PY); Novopulmon (DE, FR); Pulmicon Susp for Nebulizer (KP); Pulmicort (AT, BE, BG, BR, CH, CL, CN, CO, CR, CZ, DE, DK, DO, EE, FI, FR, GB, GR, GT, HN, ID, IN, NI, NL, NO, PA, PK, PL, PT, RU, SE, SV, TR, TW, UY, VE, ZA); Pulmicort Nasal Turbohaler (CL, KE, MU, NG); Pulmicort Turbuhaler (KE, MU, NG); Rafton (FR); Rhinocort (AU); Rhinocort Aqua (HK); Rhinoside (GR); Symbicort (FR, UK, US, ZA) Uceris (US).

Research

COVID-19
Budesonide was recommended in April 2021 by the UK's NHS to treat COVID-19 on a case-by-case basis for those aged 50 years of age and older. After a University of Oxford research team found in a trial with 1,700 patients that budesonide could benefit many people over 50 with COVID-19 symptoms, it was recommended from 12 April 2021, by the National Health Service in the UK for general practitioners (GPs) to treat COVID-19 on a case-by-case basis. Results of a large-scale trial published in August 2021 suggest that inhaled budesonide improves the time of recovery and people's well-being during the recovery process. The recommendation was withdrawn in December 2021 citing the need for more research.

Inhalational budesonide was added to the recommended treatment for cases of COVID-19 in India in April 2021.

References

External links
 
 
 

Aldols
Antiasthmatic drugs
AstraZeneca brands
Corticosteroid cyclic ketals
Corticosteroids
Cyclic acetals with aldehydes
Diketones
Diols
Enones
Glucocorticoids
Orphan drugs
Pregnanes
World Health Organization essential medicines
Wikipedia medicine articles ready to translate